The Ifakara Health Institute (IHI) is a health research organization with offices in Ifakara, Dar es Salaam, Ikwiriri, Bagamoyo, and Mtwara, Tanzania. The institute conducts health-related research in a variety of areas, including malaria and HIV/AIDS.

History 

A field laboratory of the Swiss Tropical and Public Health Institute was founded in Ifakara in 1956 by Rudolf Geigy. From 1981-1984, it was led by Marcel Tanner. It was renamed the "Ifakara Centre" in 1991, the "Ifakara Health Research and Development Centre, IHRDC" in 1996, and the "Ifakara Health Institute" in 2008.

The Ifakara Health Institute was featured in the Al Jazeera Lifelines documentary The End Game in 2014. Fredros Okumu gave a talk featuring the IHI at the TEDGlobal conference in 2017.

References

External links 
 Ifakara Health Institute Website
 Ifakara Health Institute Facebook page
 IHI Digital Library on EPrints.org
 Ifakara Health Institute on SDH-Net
 St. Francis Hospital Topography, including the IHI 

1956 establishments in Tanganyika
Medical and health organisations based in Tanzania
Research institutes in Tanzania
Science and technology in Tanzania
Scientific organisations based in Tanzania